The Reina World Tag Team Championship (Campeonato Mundial en Parejas de Reina in Spanish;  in Japanese) was a professional wrestling Tag team championship promoted by Reina Joshi Puroresu. The championship was created in September 2011 in Universal Woman's Pro Wrestling Reina (UWWR) promotion. Through UWWR's working relationship with Consejo Mundial de Lucha Libre (CMLL), CMLL wrestlers have also competed for the title. Following the dissolution of UWWR in May 2012, the title moved over to Reina X World, later renamed Reina Joshi Puroresu.

History 
Teams:
 Canadian NINJAs (Nicole Matthews and Portia Perez)
 Mia Yim and Sara Del Rey 
 La Comandante and Zeuxis
 Aki Kanbayashi and Saya

Reigns

Combined reigns

By team

By wrestler

External links 
 Official UWWR's site

See also 
 International Ribbon Tag Team Championship
 WWE Women's Tag Team Championship
 Oz Academy Tag Team Championship
 Wave Tag Team Championship
 Goddess of Stardom Championship
Women's World Tag Team Championship

References 

Women's professional wrestling tag team championships
Consejo Mundial de Lucha Libre championships